Seaville is an unincorporated community located within Upper Township in Cape May County, New Jersey, United States.

A post office was established in 1849, with Remington Corson as the first postmaster.

Seaville is home to the only yellow fire trucks in Cape May County, a tradition started in 1985 when the Seaville Fire Rescue Company was purchasing a new vehicle and thought that federal regulations would require the color. Since being formed in 1964 and purchasing its first fire truck a year later, the Seaville company has served the area, responding to over 200 calls a year from its fire station which is located on Route 50 across from Dino's Seaville Diner.

Education
As with other parts of Upper Township, the area is zoned to Upper Township School District (for grades K-8) and Ocean City School District (for high school). The latter operates Ocean City High School.

Countywide schools include Cape May County Technical High School and Cape May County Special Services School District.

Notable people
Joshua Swain Jr., buried in the Calvary Baptist Church Cemetery in Seaville
Walter S. Leaming, born in Seaville

References

Upper Township, New Jersey
Unincorporated communities in Cape May County, New Jersey
Unincorporated communities in New Jersey